Eva, ¿qué hace ese hombre en tu cama?, also known as Qué bravas son las solteras is a 1975 comedy film co-produced between Mexico, Spain and Puerto Rico, directed by Tulio Demicheli and starring Manolo Escobar, Paca Gabaldón, Iris Chacón, Olga Breeskin, Jorge Lavat and Antonio Garisa.

Plot
Manolo (Manolo Escobar), a singer, falls in love with a young woman whose photo appears on a calendar, and suffers from constant hallucinations that make hm see the young woman everywhere. At the same time, he argues with his neighbor who lives upstairs in his apartment every time Manolo tries to play the piano while writing music, because it bothers her a lot. Manolo eventually travels to Puerto Rico, upon learning that the model plans to run an advertising campaign there, only to discover that the woman, Eva (Paca Gabaldón), was also the neighbor with whom he was always arguing. From there, Manolo and Eva must go through several adventures that include Salomé (Olga Breeskin), the mentally unbalanced ex-girlfriend of Manolo who chases him with a gun; César (Jorge Lavat), Eva's boyfriend; Clotilde (Iris Chacón), an extroverted young woman friend of Eva's who crosses paths with Manolo; and Clotilde's wealthy father, Crisanto (Antonio Garisa).

Cast
Manolo Escobar as Manolo Durán
Paca Gabaldón as Eva (as Mary Francis)
Jorge Lavat as César
Olga Breeskin as Salomé
Iris Chacón as Clotilde
Antonio Garisa as Crisanto (as Antonio Gariza)
Adalberto Rodríguez
Luis Sánchez Polack as Disturbed doctor (as L. Sánchez Polack)

Box office
The film ranked 19th out of the 25 highest grossing Spanish films from 1970 to 1975.

References

Bibliography
Payá Beltrán, José. Alfonso Paso, autor. Universidad de Alicante, 2018.
García, Kino. Historia del Cine Puertorriqueño. Palibrio, 2014.
García, Kino. Cine puertorriqueño: filmografía, fuentes y referencias. Editorial LEA, 1997.
Trelles Plazaola, Luis. South American Cinema: Dictionary of Film Makers. La Editorial, UPR, 1989.
Martialay, Félix. El cine español durante el franquismo. El sastre de los libros, 2017.

External links

1975 comedy films
1975 films
Films directed by Tulio Demicheli
Mexican comedy films
Puerto Rican comedy films
Puerto Rican films
Spanish comedy films
1970s Spanish-language films
1970s Mexican films